Nahor ( – Nāḥōr;  – Nakhṓr) is the son of Serug according to the Hebrew Bible in Genesis Chapter 11. He is said to have lived to the age of 148 years old  and had a son, Terah at the age of 29. He was also the grandfather of Abraham, Nahor II and Haran, all descendants of Shem.

References 

Book of Genesis people